Teherenui Koteka (born ~1999) is a Cook Islands playwright and poet. She is a member of Pasifika and Māori arts collective Maranga Mai.

Koteka was born on Rarotonga and educated at Victoria University of Wellington, graduating with a degree in Theatre, Film, and Media Studies. In 2022 she completed a Masters in Creative Writing at the International Institute of Modern Letters.

In 2021 she presented a series of four plays in the Cook Islands titled "The Big Fkn Spectacle". In November 2022 she presented her radio play Te Maunga, Te Toa e Manakia as part of a five-part audiodrama series with Maranga Mai.

References

Living people
1999 births
People from Rarotonga
Victoria University of Wellington alumni
International Institute of Modern Letters alumni
Cook Island writers
Cook Island poets